Sunset in the West  is a 1950 American Trucolor Western film produced by Republic Pictures, directed by William Witney, and starring the "King of the Cowboys" Roy Rogers and his palomino Trigger, promoted as "The Smartest Horse in the Movies". Estelita Rodriguez, Penny Edwards, and veteran character actor Will Wright are among the production’s supporting players.

Plot 
The entertainment trade paper Variety provides the following plot summary of Sunset in the West in its 1950 review of the film:

Cast 
 Roy Rogers as himself
 Trigger, Roy's horse
 Estelita Rodriguez as Carmelita
 Penny Edwards as Dixie Osborne
 Gordon Jones as "Splinters"
 Will Wright as Sheriff Tad Osborne
 Pierre Watkin as Gordon MacKnight
 Charles La Torre as Nick Corella
 William Tannen as John Kimball (as William J. Tannen)
 Steve Pendleton as Walter Kimball (as Gaylord Pendleton)
 Paul E. Burns as "Blinky" Adams, the telegrapher
 Dorothy Ann White as Felitia, the housekeeper
 Foy Willing as Foy
 Riders of the Purple Sage as singers, cowhands

Reception 
Singing-cowboy films or "oatuners" generally received far less attention from American Western film critics than other dramatic features. Roy Rogers, however, was a major star, one recognized as "The King of the Cowboys" in Hollywood and by millions of moviegoers from the late 1930s through the 1950s. For that reason, Sunset in the West, like Roy’s other productions, received more coverage in trade publications and newspapers than other films in this genre. In its review in 1950, the film-industry magazine BoxOffice, which had a readership composed chiefly of theater owners, gives high marks to Sunset in the West, although the publication finds the "sagebrush" film's title oddly disconnected from its content: Variety endorsed the film as well in 1950, noting that its storyline had "novel twists" and "Rogers' excellent warbling is dovetailed nicely into the plot." In its review the widely read New York trade paper also draws special attention to the performance of Estelita Rodriguez, a regular costar in Roy Rogers' films of that period. "Estelita Rodriguez", writes Variety, "though given a comparatively minor role, impresses...She has excellent pipes and is a looker." Motion Picture Daily, which promoted itself in 1950 as "First in Film News", was yet another contemporary entertainment publication that gave Sunset in the West a positive review, despite what it viewed as some of the picture’s "trite dialogue". In its assessment of the film, the paper remarks, "Roy Rogers gives his usual smooth performance and sings his quota of tuneful songs". Motion Picture Daily also complimented Edward White and William Witney for effectively producing "a compact, action-full film from Gerald Geraghty’s original story." In a more recent review, published in 2005, American Western film critic Dennis Schwartz compliments both the pace of Sunset in the West and its overall direction in a similar fashion, calling it "A rousing action-packed Roy Rogers Western directed with plenty of snap by William Witney."

References and notes

External links
 
 
 
 

1950 films
1950 Western (genre) films
Trucolor films
Republic Pictures films
American Western (genre) films
Films directed by William Witney
1950s English-language films
1950s American films